Marta Ferrari is a 1956 Argentine film directed by Julio Saraceni. 
The film is about a successful actress who tells a journalist the story of her love for a musician.

Cast
 Fanny Navarro
 Duilio Marzio
 Ricardo Castro Ríos
 Santiago Gómez Cou
 Raúl Rossi
 Juan Carlos Barbieri
 Aída Luz
 Arsenio Perdiguero
 María Esther Corán

References

External links
 

1956 films
1950s Spanish-language films
Argentine black-and-white films
Films directed by Julio Saraceni
1950s Argentine films
Argentine drama films
1956 drama films